The Edgbaston Open Tournament was an early Victorian era men's and women's grass court tennis tournament first staged in June 1881, at the Edgbaston Cricket and Lawn Tennis Club, Edgbaston, Warwickshire, England. This distinct tournament ran until 1908.

History
Edgbaston Cricket and Lawn Tennis Club founded in 1878 and continued to stage both events the Edgbaston Open Tournament until 1908 and the Midland Counties until November 1964. Priory Lawn Tennis Club founded in 1865 and in May 1963 the Priory Club was destroyed by a fire, talks about merger took place of the coming months with the Edgbaston C.L.T.C. In December 1964 the new club was formed the Edgbaston Priory Club, which continued to host the Midland Counties event until 1977.

The Edgbaston Open Tournament was established on 21 July 1881, and first staged at the ground of Edgbaston Cricket and Lawn Tennis Club, in Hall Hill Road, Edgbaston.

A description of the event that concluded on  23 July 1881:

On 5 September 1882 the second edition of the Edgbaston Open Lawn Tennis Tournament was held, on the same dates and venue a dual tournament was staged called the Midland Counties Lawn Tennis Tournament (1882-1977), the men's singles was won by Mr. R.W. Smith, and the Edgbaston Open Tournament was won by George Reston Brewerton. This tournament continued to be held seperatley to that of the counties championship until 1908.

{{Blockquote|text=Edgbaston Cricket and Lawn Tennis Club was in the early decades of the two clubs the more socially prestigious and nationally high-profile, and better resourced. The focus of the Priory Club was more local but its growth was similarly impressive. The Priory Club’s tournaments and prizes were more restrained than Edgbaston’s. Priory Club tournament was played on six courts rather than Edgbaston’s twelve. |source=The History of Edgbaston Priory Club (2013) by Dr. Matt Cole: Historian Edgbaston Priory Club. Page 2.}}

FinalsIncomplete Roll''

Mens Singles

References

Sources
 Birmingham Daily Post. Thursday 23 August 1883. Birmingham, Warwickshire. England.
 Cole, Dr. Matt (2013). "History" (PDF). edgbastonpriory.com. Edgbaston Priory Club, Edgbaston, Birmingham, England.
 Heritage, (2021). edgbastonpriory.com. Edgbaston, Birmingham, England.

Defunct tennis tournaments in the United Kingdom
Grass court tennis tournaments